Aryn Michelle Calhoun (née Campbell); born September 9, 1983), known simply as Aryn Michelle, is an American Christian musician and songwriter. She has released four studio albums; Lockless Heart in 2009, Last One Standing in 2011, Depth in 2015, and The Realest Thing in 2017.

Early and personal life
Aryn Michelle Calhoun (née Campbell), was born on September 9, 1983, in Fort Worth, Texas, the daughter of a pastor, Gerald Wayne Campbell, and Aundrea Belle Campbell (née, Mull). Her songwriting career began at 15 years old. She graduated from Southwestern University in 2006, and from Berklee College of Music in 2009, where she was awarded the Scott Benson Award, given to honor songwriting. Her professional musical pursuits commenced in 2006. She is married to Clinton Calhoun.

Music career
She started her music career in 2006, while her first studio album, Lockless Heart, was released on May 12, 2009, from True Renaissance Music. Her subsequent studio album, Last One Standing, was released on October 4, 2011, with True Renaissance Music. During this time she was also recognized for her songwriting by being named TexasCSA’s 2010 Songwriter of the Year, winning KLTY’s 2010 Chick-fil-A Celebrate Freedom Jingle Competition and being a national top ten finalist in the 2011 Foldgers’ Jingle Writing Contest. Aryn began recording distinctly faith-based music in 2014 because she finally felt confirmed in her calling to write insightful, challenging, and thoughtful songs for the people of the church. In 2014 she was named Female Artist and Writer of the Year at Gospel Music Association’s Immerse Competition. She released, Depth, with True Renaissance Music, on August 14, 2015. Her song, "Do the Same", was profiled in a "Behind the Song" feature at New Release Today, with Kevin Davis. In 2017 she released a concept album on Christian apologetics that was inspired by the book "Reasonable Faith" by Dr. William Lane Craig. She released an EP of prayer and praise songs entitled "Nothing Can Take Me Away" in 2019. She released Pariah Pt. 1, a concept album inspired by the lives of biblical outcasts on September 3, 2021.

Discography
Studio albums
 Lockless Heart (May 12, 2009, True Renaissance)
 Last One Standing (October 4, 2011, True Renaissance)
 Depth (August 14, 2015, True Renaissance)
 The Realest Thing (September 15, 2017, True Renaissance)
 Nothing Can Take Me Away (April 26, 2019, True Renaissance)
 Pariah Pt.1 (September 3, 2021, True Renaissance)

References

External links
 Official website
 New Release Today profile

1983 births
Living people
American performers of Christian music
Musicians from Texas
Musicians from Massachusetts
Songwriters from Texas
Songwriters from Massachusetts
21st-century American women singers